Tomb Raider: Curse of the Sword is an action-adventure video game, part of the Tomb Raider series, developed by Core Design and published by Activision under license from Eidos Interactive. It was released for the Game Boy Color in 2001, and is a sequel to the first Tomb Raider for the same system. The next Tomb Raider game for a handheld system was Tomb Raider: The Prophecy for the Game Boy Advance.

Plot 
A long time ago, an evil magician named Madame Paveau rose to power in the underworld of New Orleans using her dark magic and sacrificing humans. The underworld became synonymous with fear, and only with the aid of a powerful, benevolent magician could people rise up against her murderous control. After a mob broke into her mansion and burnt it down, the evil magician was destroyed. Her body was shattered upon jagged precipices on the bottom of a nearby cliff.

People believed they were safe from Madame Paveau and her devilish ways, but they were not aware that one of her apprentices had survived. He performed an ancient rite by her broken body and captured her soul in a sacred container. The minion began his search for a suitable body and the proper spells that would bring his master back to life.

In a dark antiquities museum, Lara Croft witnesses the theft of a powerful sword from the museum. In the confusion and chaos of the theft, Lara is cut by the sword. Her blood on the blade makes hers the body that is needed for the ritual. The minion sets off to gather the remaining objects needed to transfer Madame Paveau's soul into Lara's body.

Lara starts pursuing the cult, hoping to save her soul, eventually tracking them down to The Bahamas. Lara succeeds in retrieving the sword and breaks it in two, preventing Paveau from resurrecting.

Development
Activision released the second Tomb Raider game for the Game Boy Color, titled Tomb Raider: Curse of the Sword, on 25 June 2001. The game utilises the game engine used for the first Tomb Raider handheld game, and features new challenges, puzzles and enemies According to Craig Harris of IGN, the game sees "Lara Croft get out of the ruins and into the cities as her adventure takes place in locations such as New York and New Orleans".

Curse of the Sword was programmed by Dan Scott and Ian Manders, and was produced by Andy Watt and Mike Schmitt. Jamie Morton and Paul Field served as level designers. The graphics and animations were done by Matt Charlesworth; additional graphics for backgrounds and cutscenes were handled by Fergus Duggan and Paschal McGuire, respectively. The music and sound effects were created by Manfred Linzner.

Reception

The game received an average score of 76.71% at GameRankings, based on an aggregate of 7 reviews.

References

External links

2001 video games
Activision games
Eidos Interactive games
Game Boy Color games
Game Boy Color-only games
Single-player video games
Video game sequels
Video games about witchcraft
Video games set in the Bahamas
Video games set in New Jersey
Video games set in New Orleans
Video games set in New York City
Curse of the Sword
Video games developed in the United Kingdom
Video games about cults